The 1975 Wimbledon Championships was a tennis tournament that took place on the outdoor grass courts at the All England Lawn Tennis and Croquet Club in Wimbledon, London, United Kingdom. The tournament was held from Monday 23 June until Saturday 5 July 1975. It was the 89th staging of the Wimbledon Championships, and the second Grand Slam tennis event of 1975. Arthur Ashe and Billie Jean King won the singles titles.

Prize money
The total prize money for 1975 championships was £114,875. The winner of the men's title earned £10,000 while the women's singles champion earned £7,000.

* per team

Champions

Seniors

Men's singles

 Arthur Ashe defeated  Jimmy Connors, 6–1, 6–1, 5–7, 6–4
It was Ashe's 3rd (and last) career Grand Slam title, and his 1st Wimbledon title.

Women's singles

 Billie Jean King defeated  Evonne Goolagong Cawley, 6–0, 6–1
It was King's 12th (and last) career Grand Slam title (her 8th in the Open Era), and her 6th Wimbledon title.

Men's doubles

 Vitas Gerulaitis /  Sandy Mayer defeated  Colin Dowdeswell /  Allan Stone, 7–5, 8–6, 6–4

Women's doubles

 Ann Kiyomura /  Kazuko Sawamatsu defeated  Françoise Dürr /  Betty Stöve, 7–5, 1–6, 7–5

Mixed doubles

 Marty Riessen /  Margaret Court defeated  Allan Stone /  Betty Stöve, 6–4, 7–5

Juniors

Boys' singles

 Chris Lewis defeated  Ricardo Ycaza, 6–1, 6–4

Girls' singles

 Natasha Chmyreva defeated  Regina Maršíková, 6–4, 6–3

Singles seeds

Men's singles
  Jimmy Connors (final, lost to Arthur Ashe)
  Ken Rosewall (fourth round, lost to Tony Roche)
  Björn Borg (quarterfinals, lost to Arthur Ashe)
  Guillermo Vilas (quarterfinals, lost to Roscoe Tanner)
  Ilie Năstase (second round, lost to Sherwood Stewart)
  Arthur Ashe (champion)
  Stan Smith (first round, lost to Byron Bertram)
  Raúl Ramírez (quarterfinals, lost to Jimmy Connors)
  Tom Okker (quarterfinals, lost to Tony Roche)
  John Alexander (second round, lost to Paul Kronk)
  Roscoe Tanner (semifinals, lost to Jimmy Connors)
  Jan Kodeš (second round, lost to Geoff Masters)
  Marty Riessen (fourth round, lost to Björn Borg)
  Vitas Gerulaitis (first round, lost to Ray Ruffels)
  Onny Parun (third round, lost to Sandy Mayer)
  Tony Roche (semifinals, lost to Arthur Ashe)

Women's singles
  Chris Evert (semifinals, lost to Billie Jean King)
  Martina Navrátilová (quarterfinals, lost to Margaret Court)
  Billie Jean King (champion)
  Evonne Goolagong Cawley (final, lost to Billie Jean King)
  Margaret Court (semifinals, lost to Evonne Goolagong Cawley)
  Virginia Wade (quarterfinals, lost to Evonne Goolagong Cawley)
  Olga Morozova (quarterfinals, lost to Billie Jean King)
  Kerry Reid (second round, lost to Sue Barker)

References

External links
 Official Wimbledon Championships website

 
Wimbledon Championships
Wimbledon Championships
Wimbledon Championships
Wimbledon Championships